The following is a list of the most populous cities in Gujarat state of India per the 2011 census. There are 31 cities in Gujarat with a population over 100,000.

Map

List 
This is a list of cities and towns in Gujarat, India.

Historical populations 
POPULATION OF MAIN CITIES OF GUJARAT 1901–2011:

See also 
 List of metropolitan areas in Gujarat
 List of most populous areas in India
 List of states and union territories of India by population
 Demographics of India

Sources 
Largest metropolitan areas in India
Largest cities in Gujarat
Largest metropolitan areas in Gujarat
 Census of India
 Gujarat Population Census data 2011

References 

Gujarat
Cities
Cities and towns in Gujarat
Gujarat
Population